Brian Harvey (born 1953) is a space writer, author and broadcaster who lives in Ireland, Brian Harvey has long written about China's space program as well as the space programs of India and Japan. He has written articles on spaceflight from the 1970s in such magazines as Orbit, Astronomy and Space, Go Taikonauts! and Spaceflight and for newspapers such as the Sunday Press and the Irish Independent. His articles have been published in Astronomy Now, Space Quarterly, Space Policy, ROOM, the Journal of the British Interplanetary Society, Space Chronicle, Zenit and Quest.

He has broadcast on the BBC World Service, Canadian Broadcasting Corporation, Voice of America, China Television (Dialogue - ideas matter), BBC Radio 4 and Radio 5 and BBC Northern Ireland. He has contributed to films by the Canadian Broadcasting Corporation (Mir), Danish television (closed ecological systems) and Australian television (the H-II Japanese rocket), subsequently shown on the Discovery channel. He has been interviewed for The Observer, Christian Science Monitor, The Guardian, Наша Газета (Nasha Gazeta), Ça m’intéresse (https://www.caminteresse.fr), Weekendavisen Scientific American, Forbes, Avaunt, La Presse (Canada), Quartz, Time out Shanghai, Open Skies and The Hindu.

He is a Fellow of the British Interplanetary Society (FBIS) and co-chaired its annual Sino-Russian forum for a number of years.  The President of Ireland appointed him to the Board of the School of Cosmic Physics of the Dublin Institute for Advanced Studies.  Brian Harvey contributed to the review of space policy by the British government that led to the establishment of the UK Space Agency (UKSA). Marking the 50th anniversary of human spaceflight, he opened the UK Yuri Gagarin exhibition, organized by the Princess Dashkova Centre of the University of Edinburgh.

He holds a primary degree in History and Political Science from Dublin University (Trinity College) and a MA in economic and social history from University College Dublin. These are his books and texts, some of which have been translated into Chinese, Russian, Korean and German.

Bibliography
 Race into space - a history of the Soviet space programme (1988)
 The new Russian space programme - from competition to collaboration (1996)
Two roads into space - the Japanese and Indian space programmes (1999)
 Russia in space - the failed frontier? also published in Korean (2001)
Europe's space programme (2003) (editor)
The Chinese Space Programme - from conception to manned spaceflight (2004)
 Rebirth of the Russian Space programme (2007)
Soviet planetary exploration, also published in Chinese (2007)
 Soviet lunar exploration, also published in Chinese (2007)
Space exploration annual 2008 (with David Harland)
Emerging space powers (with Theo Pirard and Henk Smid) (2010)
 Russian space probes (with Olga Zakutnyaya) (2011)
Discovering the cosmos with small spacecraft - the US Explorer programme (2018)
 China in space - the great leap, 2nd edition, 2019 (Chinese version due)
European - Russian cooperation in space: from de Gaulle to ExoMars (2021)

Book Chapters 

 Opening chapter, Hiding in plain view in Cold war space sleuths - the untold secrets of the Soviet space program by Dominic Phelan (ed)  (2013)
 Yuri Galperin, Cosmos 5 and Starfish in Lev Zelenyi & Tatiana Mulyarchik (eds): Yuri Galperin.  Moscow, Institute for Space Research/Russian Academy of Sciences, published in Russian as Юрий Галперин, Космос 5 и Starfish:  Юрий Ильич Галперин - 80лет со  дня рожения - Рассказы Друзей, Коллег, Учеников.  ИКИ, Москва,  (2012)
China’s lunar programme, in Moon - architectural guide by Paul Meuser (ed), DOM Berlin and Moscow Polytech (dom-publishers.com).

References

Additional sources 
 An interview of Neil Armstrong by Brian Harvey This audio interview took place when Neil Armstrong was in Dublin, Ireland to receive an honorary degree from Dublin University (Trinity College) to mark the American bicentennial, 4 July 1976.
Audio interview with Brian Harvey on the Chinese Space program on Astrotalkuk.org June 2012
Audio interview on the Chinese moon program on Voice of America 22 May 2018.
Full list of publications including book chapters.
On Dublin South 93.9 FM. Speaking at the 50th anniversary of Apollo 11. A look back at the USSR/USA space race.
The Soviet Mars Shot That Almost Everyone Forgot. Radio Free Europe. July 2020.
China Is About To Launch A Secretive Mission To Mars. Here’s What We Know (And Don’t Know) So Far. Forbes July 2020.
The Belt & Road Institute in Sweden (BRIX) podcast. April 2021.
BBC World World Service - The Real Story - China in Space. May 2021

1953 births
Living people
Irish non-fiction writers
Irish male non-fiction writers
Academics of the Dublin Institute for Advanced Studies